Marcus Noel van Raalte (22 December 1888, in Paddington, London – 5 May 1940, in Kensington, London) was a British racecar driver. A wealthy playboy whose  family owned Brownsea Island, he raced in the 1915 Indianapolis 500 in a Sunbeam, finishing in 10th place.  He later owned the first Bentley automobile.

When B-P held (at Noel's parents' invitation) the experimental Camp on Brownsea Island, Noel was 19 and helped with the Camp.  In 1910 B-P planned to take a Troop of Boy Scouts on a tour of Canada as an introduction to the Scout Movement.  Noel was one of the party.  In 1912, B-P went on a lecture tour of the U.S.A.; he travelled via the Caribbean on the S.S. Arcadia (and met his wife on the voyage).  Noel went too, as A.D.C. to B-P.  These two tours introduced Noel to North America.

Indy 500 results

References

1888 births
1940 deaths
English racing drivers
Indianapolis 500 drivers